The MTM217 is a mechanized landing craft class used by the Marina Militare.

History 

MTM217 class is a vehicle crafted to support amphibious military action.
This boat has been designed for the transport of troops and ground vehicles, as part of landing operations on the coasts.
These models are required and employed by all major navy forces, for their versatility.
The hull construction material is steel.

Eight of these craft are used as reserve craft by Brigata Marina San Marco to Brindisi Naval Station homeport.

Landing Craft

References

External links
 Ships Marina Militare website

Amphibious warfare vessel classes
Ships built in Italy
Landing craft
Amphibious warfare vessels of the Italian Navy